TCDD MT5500 was a series of diesel multiple units operated by the Turkish State Railways. The trains were used on intercity services, and offered higher speeds and comfort than steam powered trains. The DMUs were built in Italy by Fiat, and a total of 11 units were delivered in 1960-61. Trailer cars have registration numbers in the 55000 range instead of the usual 5500 range.

Fate
Two units in this series have experienced an accident after which they have been refitted as line inspection locomotives. Other units are currently being unused, however, they are kept in a workable condition as last resort units to temporarily replace other MUs in emergencies.

External links
 Trains on Turkey page on MT5500

Diesel multiple units of Turkey